Swedline Express was an airline based in Hultsfred, Sweden. It operated domestic and international passenger services.

Code data
IATA Code: SM
ICAO Code: SRL
Callsign: Starline

History
The airline was established and started operations in 1993 as Varmlandsflyg until 1 December 2002 when it changed its name to Swedline Express. It was wholly owned by Sievert Andersson.

On 12 July 2006 the airline ceased operations due to bankruptcy.

Fleet
The Swedline Express fleet consisted of the following aircraft in August 2006:
2 - Saab 2000
3 - Saab 340A

References

External links
 Swedline Express

Defunct airlines of Sweden
Airlines established in 1993
Airlines disestablished in 2006